Virgin Islands – Puerto Rico Friendship Day is a public holiday celebrated in the U.S. Virgin Islands on the second Monday in October.

Established in 1964 by Governor Paiewonsky, it honors Puerto Ricans who reside in or who have made substantial contributions to the Virgin Islands.
The date was chosen to coincide with Columbus Day, as "an appropriate day for commemorating the solidarity of Americans in the Caribbean".

Puerto Ricans in the U.S. Virgin Islands
As of 2010, about 10% of the population of the U.S. Virgin Islands (18% of Saint Croix, 3% of Saint Thomas) is Puerto Rican.

Puerto Ricans in the U.S. Virgin Islands
 Juan Francisco Luis, third elected governor of the U.S. Virgin Islands
 Arturo Alfonso Schomburg, a historian who attended high school on Saint Thomas.

Celebrations
Celebrations take place throughout the first half of October, including a sunset jazz concert, a family-fun day, dance and craft workshops, cock-fighting demonstrations, a fine step horse presentation, and a cultural exchange event. Other events include a 5K race, sports tournaments, school presentations, a coronation, a parade, and a cultural village with food, arts and crafts, and bands.

See also
 Public holidays in the United States Virgin Islands

References

External links
 October 2015 holidays in the USVI

Public holidays in the United States Virgin Islands
United States Virgin Islands people of Puerto Rican descent
Puerto Rican culture
October observances
1964 establishments in the United States Virgin Islands